Himmelfahrt (Engl: Ascension) is an industrial metal album by the German band Megaherz, released in 2000. It is the band's third full album.

Track listing

Notes
 In English, "Himmelfahrt" literally means "journey to heaven" or "ascension". In the context of the lyrics it is used in, it means the sense of doing something where the chances of surviving are slim to none.
 "Tanz auf dem Vulkan" means "to live on the edge", but literally it translates into "dance on the volcano".

Personnel 
 Alexander Wesselsky – lead-vocals
 Christian "X-ti" Bystron – guitars
 Wenz – bass
 Frank Gegerle – drums
 Noel Pix – guitars, keyboards, sampling
 Yogi Lang – keyboards, additional programming
 Petra Scheeser – female vocals on "Ruf mich an"
 Mathias "Jablonski" Elsholz – backing vocals on "Windkind" and "Falsche Götter"
 Jan Frommel – photos

Charts

References

2000 albums
Megaherz albums